Summer Time is the third studio album by Chinese singer-songwriter Roy Wang. It was released digitally on June 16, 2021 through KuGou Music, and was among the most popular Chinese pop albums of 2021.

The album contains eight songs in four chapters. The chapters "Whisper", "Whim", and "Serendipity" are solo, and the last chapter "Ignition" has two songs where Wang collaborated with Henry Lau and Jello Rio.

In this album, Wang appeared as a lyricist, composer, arranger, and producer. His style spanned several genres such as downtempo pop, urban pop, hip hop, and trap music.

Background 
On December 15, 2021, a first limited edition of the physical album was pre-sold, and 20,000 copies of the album were sold out. Rumors were that scalpers were reselling the album. Roy Wang Studio immediately decided to relaease a second edition, which was released on December 18, 2021. The pre-order was unlimited, but offered for sale in a limited time. The difference from the first-run limited edition is that the album number is not displayed.

Accolades 
Summer Time was included in the "100 must-listen albums of the Year" at the 2021 QQ Music Awards, First place for the most popular Top 10 Album of the year at Tencent Music. It also earned first place as 2021 album of the year at the Douban Awards, and second place among the Most Popular Album of the Year at the Douban Awards.

Track listing

References

External links 
 Summer Time at Spotify
 Summer Time at iHeart
 Summer Time at KuGou
 Summer Time at QQ Music
 Summer Time at Youtube

Pop albums by Chinese artists
2021 albums